Madri is a character in the Hindu epic Mahabharata. She was the princess of Madra Kingdom and the second wife of the Pandu, the king of Kuru Kingdom. Madri, with the assistance of her co-wife Kunti, invoked the twin-deities Nasatya and Darsa, collectively known as the Ashvins, and gave birth to the youngest Pandavas — the twin brothers Nakula and Sahadeva.

Etymology
The word Mādrī means 'woman of Madra'.

Life

Marriage 
Madri was the sister of Shalya, the king of the Madra Kingdom. The Adi Parva of the Mahabharata states that Bhishma, a statesman of Kuru Kingdom and the grandsire of the royal family, travelled to Madra and asked for the hand of Madri for Pandu, the ruler of the kingdom. Shalya assented, but according to their family custom, he was unable to 'bestow' his sister to the Kurus. So, Bhishma presented him with wealth, gold, elephants, and horses, and took Madri with him to Hastinapura, the capital of Kuru, and got her married to Pandu.

Marital life 

Madri is extolled to be very beautiful in the Mahabharata, and was often favoured by Pandu over his elder wife Kunti. One day, while hunting in a forest, Pandu sees a couple of deer in the process of coitus, and shoots arrows at them; only to find out that it was a sage named Kindama and his wife who were making love in the form of deer. The dying sage curses Pandu, that if he had a desire to have intercourse with any of his wives, he would die. Upset and seeking to repent his action, Pandu renounces his kingdom and lives as an ascetic with his wives.

Birth of Nakula and Sahadeva 
Due to Pandu's inability to bear children, Kunti uses a boon by Sage Durvasa to give birth to her three children Yudhisthira, Bhima and Arjuna from divine fathers. She shared the boon with Madri, who invoked the divine twins Ashwini Kumaras to beget Nakula and Sahadeva.

Death 
One day, Pandu becomes captivated by the beauty of Madri and engages in intercourse with her. Madri, despite her best efforts, is unable to fend him off from the act. As a result of the sage's curse, Pandu dies. Attributing her husband's death to herself, Madri takes her own life. A stanza in the Mahabharata states that Madri committed suicide by sati. However, this account is contradicted by the very next stanza, which states that her dead body and that of her husband were handed over by sages to the Kaurava elders in Hastinapura for the funeral rites.

References 

Characters in the Mahabharata
Indian queen consorts
Ancient Indian women